Slagle Creek is a stream in the U.S. state of Oregon. It is a tributary to the Applegate River.

Slagle Creek was named in 1858 after one Conrad Slagle.

References

Rivers of Oregon
Rivers of Jackson County, Oregon
Rivers of Josephine County, Oregon